Maastricht Airlines was a Dutch airline which had announced plans to start operating routes from Maastricht Aachen Airport using two Fokker 50 aircraft leased from the Italian cargo airline MiniLiner. The aircraft were to receive registrations PH-KVA and PH-KVB, since both aircraft once belonged to KLM Cityhopper. It was planned to extend the fleet to six aircraft. The airline was backed by the Municipality of Maastricht and the Province of Limburg.

Operations were scheduled to begin on 25 March 2013, but were postponed when late delivery of the first aircraft delayed granting of its air operator's certificate. This date was later pushed back to 1 May citing problems with the delivery of their aircraft. On the 16 April 2013 the airline announced that further delays in the delivery of the aircraft had postponed the start of their operations once again. On the 29 May the airline filed for bankruptcy, and on 4 June 2013 the court in Maastricht declared the bankruptcy.

In early July, the staff of Maastricht Airlines started crowdfunding campaign in order to save the airline. This was not successful, however.

Proposed destinations
 Germany
 Berlin - Berlin Tegel Airport 
 Munich - Munich Airport

 Netherlands
 Amsterdam - Amsterdam Airport Schiphol 
 Maastricht - Maastricht Aachen Airport Base

The airline aimed to add Copenhagen, London-Southend and Paris-Charles de Gaulle to its network in 2014.

External links
Official website

References

Defunct airlines of the Netherlands
Airlines established in 2012
Airlines disestablished in 2013